Sisenes is a genus of false blister beetles in the family Oedemeridae. There are at least two described species in Sisenes.

Species
These two species belong to the genus Sisenes:
 Sisenes championi Horn, 1896
 Sisenes personatus Champion, 1890

References

Further reading

 
 

Oedemeridae
Articles created by Qbugbot